Sandeep Guleria is a surgeon from Kangra, Himachal Pradesh, India. In 2019, Guleria was honoured with the India's fourth highest civilian award Padma Shri award by Ram Nath Kovind, the President of India, for his contribution to the field of medicine (surgery).

Life 
Guleria was born in Mazra, a small village in the Indora tehsil of Kangra, Himachal Pradesh. His father is physician Jagdev Singh Guleria and he is the younger brother of  physician Randeep Guleria. Guleria works at Apollo Hospitals as a senior consultant of GI Surgery and Transplantation. He is the president of Indian Society of Organ Transplantation (ISOT), Delhi.

References 

Indian surgeons
21st-century surgeons
Living people
Year of birth missing (living people)